This is a timeline documenting events of Jazz in the year 1934.

Events

 Louis Armstrong is in Europe, recording with French Polydor.
 Trumpeter Rex Stewart joins the Duke Ellington Band.

Standards

Deaths

 February
 27 – Gene Rodemich, pianist and orchestra leader (born 1890).

 September
 2
 Alcide Nunez, United States jazz clarinetist (born 1884).
 Russ Columbo, American singer, violinist and actor, most famous for his signature tune, "You Call It Madness, But I Call It Love" (born 1908).

 Unknown date
 Eddie Anthony, American country blues and jazz musician. He played the violin (born 1890).
 Jack Carey, trombonist, the leader of the Crescent City Orchestra (born 1889).

Births

 January
 5 – Phil Ramone, South African-American record producer, violinist, and composer (died 2013).
 8 – Georg Riedel, Swedish upright bassist.
 10
 Joe Licari, American clarinetist.
 Sheila Tracy, British broadcaster, writer, trombonist, and singer (died 2014).
 11 – Egil "Bop" Johansen, Norwegian-Swedish drummer (died 1998).
 17 – Cedar Walton, American pianist (died 2013).
 21 – Eva Olmerová, Czech singer (died 1993).

 February
 4 – Wade Legge, American pianist and bassist (died 1963).
 7 – King Curtis, American saxophonist (died 1971).
 8 – Art Porter Sr., American pianist (died 1993).
 14 – Merl Saunders, American multi-genre musician who played piano and keyboards (died 2008).
 17 – Hacke Björksten, Finnish-Swedish bandleader and saxophonist (died 2020).
 20 – Selçuk Sun, Turkish upright bassist and composer (died 2016).
 23 – Inger Berggren, Swedish singer (died 2019).
 28 – Willie Bobo, American percussionist (died 1983).

 March
 2 – Doug Watkins, American upright bassist (died 1962).
 14 – Shirley Scott, American organist (died 2002).
 26 – Don Bailey, American drummer (died 2013).
 30 – Lanny Morgan, American alto saxophonist.

 April
 5 – Stanley Turrentine, American tenor saxophonist (died 2000).
 6 – Horace Tapscott, American pianist and composer (died 1999).
 7 – Victor Feldman, British pianist (died 1987).
 8 – Bảo Vàng, Vietnamese trumpeter and composer (died 2016).
 13 – Kirk Stuart, American pianist (died 1982).
 17 – Warren Chiasson, Canadian vibraphonist.
 29 – Norman Edge, American upright bassist (died 2018).

 May
 1 – Shirley Horn, American singer and pianist (died 2005).
 14 – Warren Smith, American percussionist.
 17 – John Picard, English trombonist.
 19 – Bobby Bryant, American trumpeter and flugelhornist (died 1998).
 21 – Bob Northern, American French hornist (died 2020).

 June
 3 – Bob Wallis, British musician (died 1991).
 6 – Raymond Premru, American trombonist (died 1998).
 22 – Ray Mantilla, American drummer (died 2020).
 24 – Terry Cryer, British jazz and blues photographer (died 2017).
 26 – Dave Grusin, American composer, arranger, and pianist.

 July
 9 – Vinko Globokar, Slovene-French avant-garde composer and trombonist.
 9 – Colin Bailey, British-American drummer.
 19 – Bobby Bradford, American trumpeter and cornetist.
 22 – Junior Cook, American tenor saxophonist (died 1992).
 23
 Steve Lacy, American saxophonist and composer (died 2004).
 Tony Lee, British pianist (died 2004).
 24
 Ahmad Alaadeen, American saxophonist (died 2010).
 Rudy Collins, American drummer (died 1988).
 25 – Don Ellis, American trumpeter, and drummer (died 1978).

 August
 15 – Georgy Garanian, Russian saxophonist (died 2010).
 27 – Sylvia Telles, Brazilian singer (died 1966).
 28 – Ethel Azama, American singer (died 1984).

 September
 1 – Teri Thornton, American singer (died 2000).
 3 – Freddie King, American guitarist and singer (died 1976).
 23 – Gino Paoli, Italian singer-songwriter.
 26 – Dick Heckstall-Smith, English saxophonist (died 2004).
 27 – Ib Glindemann, Danish trumpeter and orchestra leader (died 2019).

 October
 7 – Amiri Baraka, African-American writer and music critic (died 2014).
 9 – Abdullah Ibrahim, South African pianist and composer.
 20
 Bill Chase, American trumpeter (died 1974).
 Eddie Harris, American saxophonist (died 1996).
 26 – Jacques Loussier, French pianist and composer (died 2019).
 27
 Barre Phillips, American upright bassist.
 Ivan Jullien, French trumpeter (died 2015).
 29
 Jimmy Woods, American alto saxophonist (died 2018).
 Pim Jacobs, Dutch pianist (died 1996).

 November
 7 – Jan Allan, Swedish trumpeter and composer.
 10 – Houston Person, American tenor saxophonist.
 14 – Ellis Marsalis Jr., American pianist (died 2020).
 17 – Marion Montgomery, American-born singer (died 2002).
 20 – Colin Smith, English trumpeter (died 2004).
 23 – Victor Gaskin, American upright bassist (died 2012).
 29 – Tony Coe, English clarinettist and tenor saxophonist.

 December
 5 – Art Davis, American upright bassist (died 2007).
 6 – Norio Maeda, Japanese composer and pianist (died 2018).

 21 – Hank Crawford, American alto saxophonist, arranger and songwriter (died 2009).
 24 – John Critchinson, English pianist (died 2017).
 28 – Bob Cunningham, American bassist (died 2017).

 Unknown date
 Delisa Newton, American vocalist.
 Pat Moran McCoy, American pianist.

References

External links
 History Of Jazz Timeline: 1934 at All About Jazz

Jazz, 1934 In
Jazz by year